2 Reconnaissance Regiment was the Active Citizen Force unit of the South African Special Forces. Its part-time service personnel formed part of the reserve component of the South African Defence Force.

History
This unit was established in Pretoria as 2 Reconnaissance Commando in 1974  from what had been called the Hunter Group. This was a group of Citizen Force soldiers who, under the auspices of the South African Irish Regiment, had started arranging specialised training. They were eventually formalised into 2 Reconnaissance Regiment mostly at the insistence of Brigadier G.W. Germishuizen, then Commanding Officer of Witwatersrand Command.  Later, its complement comprised Operators and personnel who had retired from active military duty to pursue civilian careers, but who could be, and were willing to be, called up to perform Special Forces operations when such a need arose.

The Regiment performed extremely well in all the operations in which it took part, beginning with their first operational deployment at the start of Operation Savannah (Angola). This was especially significant as the Operators would be called up from their civilian occupations on very short notice, and would have to make the transformation from a civilian occupation in South Africa to performing Special Forces Operators functions in a remote war zone in only a few days.
Its total strength was 2-3000 but its operational strength only a few hundred.

In 1981, 2 Reconnaissance Commando was re-designated as 2 Reconnaissance Regiment and continued to carry out its Special Forces activities until 1992, when, as part of the process of rationalisation, it was disbanded.

All Special Forces Operators and Support Staff who are retired, but are willing to be called up to assist Special Forces when required, now fall under the Special Forces Reserve and join the strengths of the existing Regiments as and when required.

Commanding officers
The unit's only commanding officer was:

Regimental Sergeants Major

See also

References

External links 
 

Special forces of South Africa
Defunct organisations based in South Africa
Disbanded military units and formations in Pretoria
Military units and formations of South Africa in the Border War
Military units and formations established in 1974
Military units and formations disestablished in 1992